The Diocese of Monmouth is a diocese of the Church in Wales. Despite the name, its cathedral is located not in Monmouth but in Newport — the Cathedral Church of St Woolos. Reasons for not choosing the title of Newport included the existence of a Catholic Bishop of Newport until 1916. This apparent anomaly arose in 1921 when the diocese was created (from the eastern part of the Diocese of Llandaff) with no location for the cathedral yet chosen. Various options were being considered, such as restoring Tintern Abbey, building from scratch on Ridgeway Hill in Newport, and (the eventual choice) upgrading St Woolos, then a parish church; in the meantime the new diocese, as it covers more or less the territory of the county of Monmouth, was named the "Diocese of Monmouth".  Prior to 1921 the area had been the archdeaconry of Monmouth.

It is headed by Cherry Vann, Bishop of Monmouth. She was elected the eleventh bishop in September 2019 and enthroned in Newport Cathedral on 1 February 2020.

In its own words, the diocese "covers the south east corner of Wales, from Monmouth south to Chepstow, westwards along the 'M4 corridor' to Newport and the outskirts of Cardiff, northwards into the south eastern valleys and east into the rural areas around Usk, Raglan, Abergavenny and the Herefordshire border".

In local government terms, the territory of the diocese covers the unitary authority areas of:
 Monmouthshire
 Newport
 Torfaen
 Blaenau Gwent (part)
 Caerphilly (part)
 Cardiff (part)
 Herefordshire (part)

Archdeaconries and deaneries 

At the Diocesan Conference, October 2017, the creation of a third archdeaconry — Gwent Valleys — from the two deaneries of Bedwellty and of Pontypool, was approved.

List of archdeacons

Archdeacons of Monmouth
The archdeaconry of Monmouth was erected, from the Llandaff archdeaconry, in the Diocese of Llandaff on 6 February 1844.
26 February 1844 – 1885 (ret.): William Crawley
1885–1914 (res.): William Conybeare Bruce
1914–1921 (res.): Charles Green
From its creation in 1921, the archdeaconry has been in Monmouth diocese.
1922–1926 (d.): David Griffiths
1926–1930 (res.): David Roberts
1930–1940 (res.): Alfred Monahan
1940–1954: Samuel Davies
1955–1963: Joseph Ralph Jones
1963–1973: Ernest Evans
1973–1976: Cecil Percival Willis
1976–1977 (res.): Clifford Wright
1977–1986 (res.): Barrie Evans
1986–1993 (res.): Keith Tyte
1993–2001: Peter Woodman
2001–2008: Glyndwr Hackett
2008–2013 (res.): Richard Pain
24 November 201312 March 2021: Ambrose Mason
20 June 2021present: Ian Rees

Archdeacons of Newport
The archdeaconry of Newport was created from the Monmouth archdeaconry in 1930.
1931–1935: the Dean of Monmouth provisionally
1935–1948 (ret.): Vaughan Rees
1948–1953 (d.): Thomas Parry Pryce
1953–1964 (ret.): Charles Lewis (afterwards archdeacon emeritus)
1964–1973: Ivor Philips
1973–1976: Ernest Evans
1976–1977: (d) Cecil Percival Willis
1977–1986 (res.): Clifford Wright
1986–1993 (ret.): Barrie Evans
1993–1997 (ret.): Keith Tyte
1997–2008: Kenneth Sharpe
2008–2012: Glyndwr Hackett
9 September 2012–present: Jonathan Williams
Newport archdeaconry was split in 2018 to create Gwent Valleys archdeaconry

Archdeacons of the Gwent Valleys
The archdeaconry was erected from Newport archdeaconry in 2018.
7 July 2018July 2021 (d.): Sue Pinnington
19 June 2022 : Stella Bailey

List of churches

Deanery of Abergavenny

Closed churches in the area

Deanery of Monmouth

Closed churches in this area

Deanery of Netherwent

Closed churches in the area

Deanery of Raglan-Usk

Closed churches in this area

Deanery of Bassaleg

Closed churches in this area

Deanery of Newport

Closed churches in this area

Deanery of Bedwellty

Closed churches in this area

Deanery of Pontypool

Closed churches in the area

Dedications 
This table is drawn from the above lists.

See also 

 List of Church in Wales churches

References

External links
Diocese of Monmouth

History of Monmouthshire
Dioceses of the Church in Wales
Organisations based in Newport, Wales